In physics, the wavefront of a time-varying wave field is the set (locus) of all points having the same phase.  The term is generally meaningful only for fields that, at each point, vary sinusoidally in time with a single temporal frequency (otherwise the phase is not well defined).

Wavefronts usually move with time.  For waves propagating in a unidimensional medium, the wavefronts are usually single points; they are curves in a two dimensional medium, and surfaces in a three-dimensional one. 

For a sinusoidal plane wave, the wavefronts are planes perpendicular to the direction of propagation, that move in that direction together with the wave.  For a sinusoidal spherical wave, the wavefronts are spherical surfaces that expand with it.  If the speed of propagation is different at different points of a wavefront, the shape and/or orientation of the wavefronts may change by refraction.  In particular, lenses can change the shape of optical wavefronts from planar to spherical, or vice versa.

In classical physics, the diffraction phenomenon is described by the Huygens–Fresnel principle that treats each point in a propagating wavefront as a collection of individual spherical wavelets. The characteristic bending pattern is most pronounced when a wave from a coherent source (such as a laser) encounters a slit/aperture that is comparable in size to its wavelength, as shown in the inserted image. This is due to the addition, or interference, of different points on the wavefront (or, equivalently, each wavelet) that travel by paths of different lengths to the registering surface. If there are multiple, closely spaced openings (e.g., a diffraction grating), a complex pattern of varying intensity can result.

Simple wavefronts and propagation
Optical systems can be described with Maxwell's equations, and linear propagating waves such as sound or electron beams have similar wave equations. However, given the above simplifications, Huygens' principle provides a quick method to predict the propagation of a wavefront through, for example, free space. The construction is as follows: Let every point on the wavefront be considered a new point source. By calculating the total effect from every point source, the resulting field at new points can be computed. Computational algorithms are often based on this approach. Specific cases for simple wavefronts can be computed directly. For example, a spherical wavefront will remain spherical as the energy of the wave is carried away equally in all directions. Such directions of energy flow, which are always perpendicular to the wavefront, are called rays creating multiple wavefronts.

The simplest form of a wavefront is the plane wave, where the rays are parallel to one another. The light from this type of wave is referred to as collimated light. The plane wavefront is a good model for a surface-section of a very large spherical wavefront; for instance, sunlight strikes the earth with a spherical wavefront that has a radius of about 150 million kilometers (1 AU). For many purposes, such a wavefront can be considered planar over distances of the diameter of Earth.

Wavefronts travel with the speed of light in all directions in an isotropic medium.

Wavefront aberrations

Methods utilizing wavefront measurements or predictions can be considered an advanced approach to lens optics, where a single focal distance may not exist due to lens thickness or imperfections. For manufacturing reasons, a perfect lens has a spherical (or toroidal) surface shape though, theoretically, the ideal surface would be aspheric. Shortcomings such as these in an optical system cause what are called optical aberrations. The best-known aberrations include spherical aberration and coma.
 
However there may be more complex sources of aberrations such as in a large telescope due to spatial variations in the index of refraction of the atmosphere. The deviation of a wavefront in an optical system from a desired perfect planar wavefront is called the wavefront aberration. Wavefront aberrations are usually described as either a sampled image or a collection of two-dimensional polynomial terms. Minimization of these aberrations is considered desirable for many applications in optical systems.

Wavefront sensor and reconstruction techniques

A wavefront sensor is a device which measures the wavefront aberration in a coherent signal to describe the optical quality or lack thereof in an optical system. A very common method is to use a Shack–Hartmann lenslet array. There are many applications that include adaptive optics, optical metrology and even the measurement of the aberrations in the eye itself. In this approach, a weak laser source is directed into the eye and the reflection off the retina is sampled and processed.

Alternative wavefront sensing techniques to the Shack–Hartmann system are emerging. Mathematical techniques like phase imaging or curvature sensing are also capable of providing wavefront estimations. These algorithms compute wavefront images from conventional brightfield images at different focal planes without the need for specialised wavefront optics. While Shack-Hartmann lenslet arrays are limited in lateral resolution to the size of the lenslet array, techniques such as these are only limited by the resolution of digital images used to compute the wavefront measurements. That said, those wavefront sensors are suffering from linearity issues and so are much less robust than the original SHWFS, in term of phase measurement. 

Another application of software reconstruction of the phase is the control of telescopes through the use of adaptive optics. A common method is the Roddier test, also called wavefront curvature sensing. It yields good correction but needs an already good system as a starting point.

See also
 Huygens-Fresnel principle
 Wavefront sensor
 Adaptive optics
 Deformable mirror
 Wave field synthesis

References

Further reading

Textbooks and books

 Concepts of Modern Physics (4th Edition), A. Beiser, Physics, McGraw-Hill (International), 1987, 
 Physics with Modern Applications, L. H. Greenberg, Holt-Saunders International W. B. Saunders and Co, 1978, 
 Principles of Physics, J. B. Marion, W. F. Hornyak, Holt-Saunders International Saunders College, 1984, 
 Introduction to Electrodynamics (3rd Edition), D. J. Griffiths, Pearson Education, Dorling Kindersley, 2007, 
 Light and Matter: Electromagnetism, Optics, Spectroscopy and Lasers, Y. B. Band, John Wiley & Sons, 2010, 
 The Light Fantastic – Introduction to Classic and Quantum Optics, I. R. Kenyon, Oxford University Press, 2008, 
 McGraw Hill Encyclopaedia of Physics (2nd Edition), C. B. Parker, 1994,

Journals
 
 
 
 
 Wavefront tip/tilt estimation from defocused images

External links
 LightPipes – Free Unix wavefront propagation software

Optics
Waves